The Atacama Cosmology Telescope (ACT) was a cosmological millimeter-wave telescope located on Cerro Toco in the Atacama Desert in the north of Chile. ACT made high-sensitivity, arcminute resolution, microwave-wavelength surveys of the sky in order to study the cosmic microwave background radiation (CMB), the relic radiation left by the Big Bang process.

Cosmic microwave background experiments like ACT, the South Pole Telescope, the WMAP satellite, and the Planck satellite have provided foundational evidence for the standard Lambda-CDM model of cosmology. ACT first detected seven acoustic peaks in the power spectrum of the CMB, discovered the most extreme galaxy cluster and made the first statistical detection of the motions of clusters of galaxies via the pairwise kinematic Sunyaev-Zeldovich Effect.

ACT was buit in 2007 and saw first light on October 2007 with its first receiver, the Millimeter Bolometer Array Camera (MBAC). ACT has had two major receiver upgrades which enabled polarization sensitive observations: ACTPol (2013-2016) and Advanced ACT (2017-2022). ACT observations ended in mid-2022. ACT is funded by the US National Science Foundation.

Science goals 
Measurements of cosmic microwave background radiation (CMB) by experiments such as COBE, BOOMERanG, WMAP, CBI, the South Pole Telescope and many others, have greatly advanced our knowledge of cosmology, particularly the early evolution of the universe. At the arcminute resolutions probed by ACT, the Sunyaev-Zeldovich effect, by which galaxy clusters leave an imprint on the CMB, is prominent. This method of detection provides a redshift-independent measurement of the mass of the clusters, meaning that very distant, ancient clusters are as easy to detect as nearby clusters.

Detection of galaxy clusters and follow-up measurements in visible and X-ray light, provide a picture of the evolution of structure in the universe since the Big Bang. This is used to improve our understanding of the nature of the mysterious dark energy which seems to be a dominant component of the universe.

High sensitivity observations of the cosmic microwave background radiation allow precision measurements of cosmological parameters, detection of galaxy clusters among other scientific goals, probing the early and late stages in the history of the evolution of the universe.

Scientific highlights 
Throughout its operation, ACT contributed the scientific community with:

 The first detection of seven acoustic peaks in the power spectrum of the CMB.
 First detection of gravitational lensing in a CMB map only.
 First measurement of the cross-correlation between optical quasars and CMB lensing.
 First measurement of the cross correlation between CMB lensing and galaxy lensing.
 Discovery of the most extreme galaxy cluster.
 First measurement of the motions of clusters of galaxies using the kinematic pairwise Sunyaev-Zeldovich effect.
 Provided updated estimates of the Hubble constant.
 Provided evidence of dark energy using CMB data alone
 First statistical detection of CMB lensing by massive halos
 First measurement of the motions of clusters of galaxies using the velocity reconstruction method.
 First joint thermal and kinematic Sunyaev-Zeldovich effect galaxy profile measurement. 
 A blind search for Planet Nine.

Location 

Water vapor in the atmosphere emits microwave radiation which contaminates measurements of the CMB, for this reason CMB telescopes benefit from arid, high-altitude locations. Due to the exceptional observing conditions of the Atacama Desert and its accessibility by road and nearby ports, several other observatories are located in the region, including CBI, ASTE, Nanten, APEX and ALMA. These astronomical observatories and telescopes form the Llano de Chajnantor Observatory, a cluster of astronomical telescopes primarily in millimeter and sub-millimeter wavelengths.

Design

Telescope 
The ACT is an off-axis Gregorian telescope. This off-axis configuration is beneficial to minimize artifacts in the point spread function. The telescope reflectors consist of a  primary mirror and a  secondary mirror. Both mirrors are composed of segments, consisting of 71 (primary) and 11 (secondary) aluminum panels. These panels follow the shape of an ellipsoid of revolution and are carefully aligned to form a joint surface. Unlike most telescopes which track the rotating sky during observation, the ACT observes the sky by keeping the telescope oriented at a constant elevation and by scanning back and forth in azimuth at the relatively rapid rate of two degrees per second. A ground screen surrounding the telescope blocks contamination from microwave radiation emitted by the ground. The design, manufacture and construction of the telescope were done by Dynamic Structures in Vancouver, British Columbia.

Instrument 
ACT can accommodate three instrument cameras simultaneously. Over time these cameras have been upgraded from the original MBAC design to the current Advanced ACT instrument progressively adding more features like polarization sensitivity and the ability to sense multiple frequencies in one instrument module. Each camera in ACT consists of a three lens system, the Gregorian focus is reimaged into a detector focal plane, a Lyot stop reimages the primary mirror allowing stray light mitigation.

The three lenses in ACT are made of cryogenically cooled anti-reflection coated silicon, a desirable material for instruments in the millimeter due to its high index of refraction (n=3). Anti-reflection coatings in ACTPol and AdvACT are made of sub-wavelength structured metamaterial silicon, an innovation in ground based CMB telescopes at the time. The optical components and the detector module are kept at a vacuum with a plastic window. A stack of filters reject infra-red radiation which is detrimental for mm-wavelength observations.

Radiation is thermally coupled to transition-edge sensor bolometers, which are read out using an array of SQUIDs.

Observations 
Observations are made at resolutions of about an arcminute (1/60th of a degree) in three frequencies: 145 GHz, 215 GHz and 280 GHz. The detectors are superconducting transition-edge sensors, a technology whose high sensitivity allows measurements of the temperature of the CMB to within a few millionths of a degree. A system of cryogenic helium refrigerators keep the detectors a third of a degree above absolute zero.

Detectors 
ACT has had three generations of cameras. Each camera is the result of the development of specialized detector technology which has been optimized through the years. These cameras take advantage of superconducting transition edge sensor arrays to achieve high sensitivity. 

The first array of cameras to populate the ACT focal plane (MBAC) consisted of three cameras where each one was sensitive to its own band and had no polarization sensitivity. The second generation of cameras (ACTPol) added polarization sensitivity and the first camera to be sensitive to two bands (dichroic). The third generation of cameras (AdvACT) incorporated the advances achieved in ACTPol, which allowed all cameras to be sensitive to two bands.

Institutions

ACT has collaborators at Princeton University, Cornell University, the University of Pennsylvania, NASA/GSFC, the Johns Hopkins University, the University of British Columbia, NIST, the Pontificia Universidad Católica de Chile, the University of KwaZulu-Natal, Perimeter Institute for Theoretical Physics, the Canadian Institute for Theoretical Astrophysics, Stanford University, Stony Brook University, Cardiff University, Argonne National Laboratory, Haverford College, Rutgers University, the University of Pittsburgh, UC Berkeley, University of Southern California, the University of Oxford, the University of Paris-Saclay, University of Illinois at Urbana-Champaign, SLAC National Accelerator Laboratory, Caltech, McGill University, the  Center for Computational Astrophysics, Arizona State University, Columbia University, Carnegie Mellon University, the University of Chicago, Haverford College, Florida State University, West Chester University, Yale University, and the University of Toronto.

See also
 BICEP and Keck Array
 Llano de Chajnantor Observatory
 List of highest astronomical observatories
 Lists of telescopes

Notes

References

External links

 The ACT Homepage

Cosmic microwave background experiments
Submillimetre telescopes
Astronomical observatories in Chile
Cosmology
Buildings and structures in Antofagasta Region
National Science Foundation
2007 establishments in Chile